Tim Earley (born 1972  in Forest City, North Carolina) is an American poet. He is the author of four collections of poems, Boondoggle (Main Street Rag, 2005), The Spooking of Mavens (Cracked Slab Books, 2010), Poems Descriptive of Rural Life and Scenery (Horse Less Press, 2014), and Linthead Stomp (Horse Less Press, 2016).

Early life 
Timothy Darren Earley was born and raised in Western North Carolina.

Education 
He holds an M.F.A. in creative writing from the University of Alabama.

Career 
His work has appeared in the Chicago Review, jubilat, the Southern Humanities Review, and the Green Mountains Review. His work has been featured in Literary Trails of the North Carolina Mountains (University of North Carolina at Chapel Hill Press, 2007), The Ecopoetry Anthology (Trinity University Press), edited by Ann Fisher-Wirth and Laura-Gray Street, and Hick Poetics (Lost Roads Press, 2015), edited by Abraham Smith and Shelly Taylor. The collection Poems Descriptive of Rural Life and Scenery was published by Horseless Press in early 2014; Seth Abramson, in a review in The Huffington Post, referred to Earley as a "Southern Seer" and said he "is a master of anaphora, Biblical rhythms, revelatory testimony, tell-it-slant aggression, and juxtapositive imagery that borrows heavily from the Southern lexicon", his poetry "not merely urgent but dam-broken".

Personal life 
Earley moved to Denver, CO in 2015. Previously, he lived in Oxford, Mississippi.

Awards 
 AWP Intro/Journals Award
 1998-1999 Writing Fellowship, Fine Arts Work Center, Provincetown 
 2002-2003 Writing Fellowship, Fine Arts Work Center, Provincetown
2015 Mississippi Institute of Arts and Letters Poetry Award Winner

Selected bibliography

Collections 
 
 
  .
 
 Earley, Tim (2016). Linthead Stomp. Grand Rapids, Michigan: Horse Less Press.

Work available online 
 Boondoggle
 What's Happening

References

External links 
 Profile page: Timothy Earley University of Mississippi (Ole Miss)
 Review of Boondoggle at DIAGRAM
 Review of Boondoggle by Marci-Nelligan

1972 births
21st-century American poets
Living people
University of Alabama alumni
People from Oxford, Mississippi